Senecio aquilaris is a species of flowering plant in the family Asteraceae. It is native to Argentina and Bolivia.

References

aquilaris
Flora of Bolivia
Flora of Argentina
[[Category:Taxa named by Ángel Lulio Cabrera|]